Hexthorpe railway platform was a short, wooden railway platform on the South Yorkshire Railway line about  west of Doncaster in the area known as Hexthorpe Flatts, just on the Doncaster side of the road bridge. The platform was situated on the Doncaster – bound line and was normally used for the collection of tickets particularly on the days of the St. Leger race meeting.

1887 accident

On 16 September 1887 the platform was the scene of a tragic railway accident. The Hexthorpe rail accident was one of a series of accidents which occurred in the "Battle of the Brakes", a period when railway managements were in dispute over the type of brake, if any, which should be used on passenger trains. The death toll reached 25 and 66 were injured.

References 

 Great Central, Volume 2  George Dow, Locomotive Publishing Co.,
 Historic Railway Disasters by O.S. Nock. Ian Allan. 1966. 

Disused railway stations in Doncaster